Dupcheshwor is a Rural municipality located within the Nuwakot District of the Bagmati Province of Nepal.
The municipality spans  of area, with a total population of 22,106 according to a 2011 Nepal census.

On March 10, 2017, the Government of Nepal restructured the local level bodies into 753 new local level structures.
The previous Ghyangphedi, Gaunkharka, Rautbesi, Beteni Balkumari, Samundratar and Shikharbesi VDCs were merged to form Dupcheshwor Rural Municipality.
Dupcheshwor is divided into 7 wards, with Samundratar declared the administrative center of the rural municipality.

Notable people 

 Arjun Narasingha KC
 Kedar Narsingh KC

References

External links
official website of the rural municipality

Rural municipalities in Nuwakot District
Rural municipalities of Nepal established in 2017